Yonathan Jesús Fernández García (born 14 April 1986) is a cross-country skier from Chile. He competed for Chile at the 2014 Winter Olympics in the sprint event. He became the first cross country skier to compete for Chile at the Winter Olympics He carried Chile's flag during the closing ceremonies.

At the 2018 Winter Olympics in Pyeongchang, he finished 102nd in the Men's 15 km freestyle cross-country ski event. To prepare for the 2018 Olympics, he trained with Tongan skier Pita Taufatofua and Mexican skier Germán Madrazo in Austria.

Notes

References

External links
 

1986 births
Living people
Cross-country skiers at the 2014 Winter Olympics
Cross-country skiers at the 2018 Winter Olympics
Cross-country skiers at the 2022 Winter Olympics
Chilean male cross-country skiers
Olympic cross-country skiers of Chile
People from Punta Arenas
21st-century Chilean people